The men's individual compound competition of the archery events at the 2019 Pan American Games  was held from 7 August to 10 August at the Archery field at the Villa Maria de Triunfo in Lima, Peru.

Schedule

Results

Ranking round
The results were as follows:

Elimination rounds
The results were as follows:

References

Archery at the 2019 Pan American Games